The Goodhart Baronetcy, of Portland Place in St Marylebone and of Holtye in the County of Sussex, is a title in the Baronetage of the United Kingdom. It was created on 1 July 1911 for the prominent paediatrician James Goodhart. He was notably consulting physician to Guy's Hospital and Evelina Children's Hospital and co-author of the textbook Diseases of Children (1905).

Goodhart baronets, of Portland Place and Holtye (1911)
Sir James Frederic Goodhart, 1st Baronet (1845–1916)
Sir Ernest Frederic Goodhart, 2nd Baronet (1880–1961)
Sir John Gordon Goodhart, 3rd Baronet (1916–1979)
Sir Robert Anthony Gordon Goodhart, 4th Baronet (born 1948)

References

Kidd, Charles, Williamson, David (editors). Debrett's Peerage and Baronetage (1990 edition). New York: St Martin's Press, 1990.

Goodhart